Steeven Willems (born 31 August 1990) is a French footballer who plays as a centre back.

References

External links
 

1990 births
People from Seclin
Footballers from Hauts-de-France
Living people
Association football central defenders
French footballers
Lille OSC players
R. Charleroi S.C. players
Belgian Pro League players
Expatriate footballers in Belgium
French expatriate footballers
French expatriate sportspeople in Belgium